Syed Nasir Ismail (Urdu: سید ناصر اسماعیل; born 17 July 1967) is a Pakistani football manager and former international player. He is an AFC Licence-A coach.

He was the head coach of NBP F.C., and helped the team win promotion to the Pakistan Premier League after winning the 2004–05 PFF National League. He has also been the assistant coach of the Pakistan national team. He has also served as the coach of Masha United from 2020 to 2022.

He has also coached the Pakistan U-14 side.

References

External links

Pakistani footballers
Pakistan international footballers
Living people
1967 births
Association football midfielders